is a mountain in the Kongō Range straddling the border between Osaka and Wakayama Prefectures in Japan.

Location and naming
Mount Izumi Katsuragi is an  mountain located on the Kongō Range, straddling the prefectural boundary between Osaka and Wakayama in Japan. Parts of the mountain lie in Kishiwada and Kaizuka, Osaka, as well as in Kinokawa, Wakayama. 

Mount Izumi Katsuragi has been known as the heart of the Katsuragi Mountains since ancient times.

Environs
The north slope of Mount Izumi Katsuragi is covered in a wood of Japanese beech, which favor growing at elevations high enough to remain fairly cool. Harvesting the trees in this wood is forbidden by the association of Hachidairyūō shrines and temples, and this is the southernmost stand of Japanese beech on Honshū. The trees in the area were designated a national protected species in 1923, allowing them to continue to thrive in an area very close to suburban and urban growth.

Access and amenities
Mount Izumi Katsuragi is easily accessible by car from three different directions, with all three roads meeting near the summit. There is also a Nankai Wing Bus which travels between the bus stop at Kishiwada Station and the Ushitakiyama (牛滝山) bus stop near the base of the mountain. From there, it takes about 60 minutes to hike to the summit. 

There are no lodging, toilet, or food services at the summit.

Gallery

See also
Mount Minami Katsuragi
Mount Naka Katsuragi
Mount Yamato Katsuragi

Notes

References

External links

 Kishiwada City - Mount Izumi Katsuragi - Beech Woodland 
 Kaizuka City - Mount Izumi Katsuragi - Beech Woodland 
 Outdoors and Sports - Kinokawa City Sightseeing Guide 

Mountains of Wakayama Prefecture
Mountains of Osaka Prefecture